The Necromancers: The Best of Black Magic And Witchcraft is an anthology of occult stories edited by Peter Haining and published by Hodder and Stoughton in 1971. The collection of stories in this anthology is a blend of fact and fiction. This anthology includes stories, folklore, essays and focuses on witchcraft and Satanism. The editor's preface by Peter Haining provides a brief overview of the theme of this compilation and it is followed by an introduction by Robert Bloch.

Stories collected

References 
 Book review: The Necromancers by Peter Haining (Editor) The Book Haven. Retrieved 27 July 2016
 The Necromancers: The Best of Black Magic and Witchcraft, Google Books

1971 anthologies
Fiction anthologies
Horror anthologies
Hodder & Stoughton books